Ferdinand Ries composed his Violin Sonata in A-flat major, WoO. 5 in 1800, when he was 18 years old. There is no evidence the work was performed during the composer's lifetime, and it remained unpublished at his death. The manuscript survives at the Berlin State Library.

Structure

The sonata is structured in four movements:

 Allegro ma non troppo 
 Scherzo
 Adagio con moto 
 Rondo: Allegretto

References
Notes

Sources
  
 

Violin sonatas by Ferdinand Ries
1800 compositions
Compositions in A-flat major
Compositions for harpsichord